De Club van Sinterklaas en de Race Tegen de Klok is a 2022 Dutch film written and directed by Martijn Koevoets. The film won the Golden Film award after having sold 100,000 tickets. It was the sixth best visited Dutch film of 2022 with just over 210,000 visitors.

Wilbert Gieske, Beryl van Praag and Anouk de Pater are some of the cast members of the film. Footballer Nathan Rutjes and presenter Britt Dekker also appear in the film.

References

External links 
 

2022 films
2020s Dutch-language films
Dutch children's films
Sinterklaas films
Films shot in the Netherlands
Films directed by Martijn Koevoets